Lompoc (Chumanshan ) is a city in Santa Barbara County, California. Located on the Central Coast, Lompoc has a population of 43,834 as of July 2021.

Lompoc has been inhabited for thousands of years by the Chumash people, who called the area , meaning 'stagnant waters' or 'lagoon' in the local Purisimeño language. The Spanish called the area  after Fermín de Lasuén had established  in 1787. In 1837, the Mexican government sold the area as the Rancho Lompoc land grant. Following the U.S. conquest of California, multiple settlers acquired the Lompoc Valley, including William Welles Hollister, who sold the land around the mission to the Lompoc Valley Land Company, which established a temperance colony which incorporated in 1888 as Lompoc. Lompoc is often considered a military town because it is near Vandenberg Space Force Base.

History

Before the Spanish conquest, the area around Lompoc was inhabited by the Chumash people. The Original Mission La Purísima was established in 1787 near what is now the southern edge of the city. Purisimeño, a Chumashan language, was spoken in the region during the mission period. After independence from the Spanish Empire, the First Mexican Empire was established in 1821. The Mexicans secularized the Spanish missions in 1833, and La Purisima Mission fell into ruins.

In 1893, a diatomaceous earth mine, formerly owned by Johns Manville, World Mineral, and Celite corporation, now Imerys Inc., opened in the southern hills in Miguelito Canyon. It became (and still is) the largest marine diatomite mine in the world, and at one time was the largest employer in the valley. While owned by Johns Manville, the mine employed more than 900 people at its peak, and built housing for its employees onsite and in town; the houses in town are next to JM park, which was donated to the city by the mine. Another diatomaceous earth company, Grefco, operated here from the 1940s until 1998. The remnants of its mine at the northeast end of town were torn down in 2001.

In 1909, the Sibyl Marston—at the time, the largest steam schooner built on the West Coast—sank nearby while carrying  of lumber. Many of the older Lompoc homes were built with lumber from the shipwreck. The wreckage can still be seen south of Surf Beach.

The coastal branch of the Southern Pacific Railroad opened around 1900 and eventually replaced ship transportation. A paved road linked Lompoc to Buellton and the rest of California around 1920. In 1923, the Honda Point disaster, the U.S.'s largest peacetime naval accident, occurred just off the coast; nine U.S. destroyers ran aground, killing 23 people. During the Great Depression, La Purisima Mission was restored by the Civilian Conservation Corps (CCC). During World War II, the coast west of Lompoc was the site of Camp Cooke, a United States Army training camp where large units could practice maneuvers.

Lompoc grew slowly until 1958, when the United States Air Force announced that the former Camp Cooke would be a test site for the Thor family of intermediate-range ballistic missiles and the first operational base for the SM-65 Atlas, an intercontinental ballistic missile. The city then began to grow rapidly to provide housing for thousands of civilians and contractors employed at what was soon renamed Vandenberg Air Force Base. It was the Air Force's first missile base.

The Space Shuttle program was slated to begin launches from Vandenberg in the late 1980s, and the city experienced a boom in restaurant and hotel construction in anticipation of tourists coming to see shuttle launches. However, when the Challenger exploded during take-off from Cape Canaveral in 1986, the West Coast shuttle program was terminated, sending Lompoc into a severe recession.

Geography

Most of the city is in the valley of the Santa Ynez River, at an elevation of about 80–100 feet (25–30 meters). Expansion has been to the north, on higher ground known as Vandenberg Village, with elevations of 150–300 feet (50–100 meters). Like most rivers in Southern California, the Santa Ynez River does not have a surface flow for most of the year. Underground flow in the sandy river bed recharges the aquifer beneath the city, from which nine wells (with a tenth one planned) supply the city with water. Unlike many other cities in Southern California, Lompoc is not connected to the State Water Project.

Climate
Lompoc has a cool Mediterranean climate (Köppen climate classification Csb), typical of coastal California. The city is mostly sunny, with an ocean breeze. Fog is common. Snow is virtually unknown.

Demographics

2010

In the 2010 United States Census, Lompoc had a population of 42,434. The racial makeup was 25,950 (61.2%) White; 2,432 (5.7%) African American; 750 (1.8%) Native American; 1,615 (3.8%) Asian; 186 (0.4%) Pacific Islander; 9,020 (21.3%) from other races; and 2,481 (5.8%) from two or more races. There were 21,557 Hispanics or Latinos of any race (50.8%).

The Census reported that 38,778 people (91.4% of the population) lived in households, 99 (0.2%) lived in non-institutionalized group quarters, and 3,557 (8.4%) were institutionalized.

There were 13,355 households, of which 5,481 (41.0%) had children under the age of 18 living in them; 6,323 (47.3%) were opposite-sex married couples living together; 2,061 (15.4%) had a female householder with no husband present; and 913 (6.8%) had a male householder with no wife present. There were 949 (7.1%) unmarried opposite-sex partnerships and 75 (0.6%) same-sex married couples or partnerships. 3,304 households (24.7%) were made up of individuals, and 1,187 (8.9%) had someone living alone who was 65 years of age or older. The average household size was 2.9. There were 9,297 families (69.6% of all households); the average family size was 3.48.

The population included 11,188 people (26.4%) under the age of 18, 4,452 people (10.5%) aged 18 to 24, 12,233 people (28.8%) aged 25 to 44, 10,338 people (24.4%) aged 45 to 64, and 4,223 people (10.0%) who were 65 or older. The median age was 33.9 years. For every 100 females, there were 114.9 males. For every 100 females age 18 and over, there were 118.7 males.

The homeowner vacancy rate was 2.2%; the rental vacancy rate was 7.1%. 18,534 people (43.7% of the population) lived in owner-occupied housing units, and 20,244 people (47.7%) lived in rental housing units.

2000

As of the 2000 Census, there were 43,284 people, 13,059 households and 9,311 families residing in Lompoc. The racial makeup of the city was 65.81% White, 7.34% African American, 1.58% Native American, 3.90% Asian, 0.32% Pacific Islander, 15.68% from other races, and 5.35% from two or more races. Hispanics or Latinos of any race were 37.31% of the population.

There were 13,059 households, of which 41.1% had children under the age of 18 living with them, 51.0% were married couples living together, 14.8% had a female householder with no husband present, and 28.7% were non-families. 23.5% of all households were made up of individuals, and 8.3% had someone living alone who was 65 or older. The average household size was 2.88, and the average family size was 3.42.

The population included 29.9% under the age of 18, 8.9% from 18 to 24, 33.3% from 25 to 44, 18.5% from 45 to 64, and 9.4% who were 65 or older. The median age was 32. For every 100 females, there were 113.0 males. For every 100 females age 18 and over, there were 116.4 males.

The median income for a household in the city was $47,587, and the median income for a family was $62,199. Males had a median income of $35,074, versus $26,824 for females. The per capita income was $15,509. About 12.6% of families and 15.4% of the population were below the poverty line, including 20.8% of those under 18 and 6.7% of those 65 or older.

Economy

Vandenberg Space Force Base dominates the economy, directly employing more Lompoc residents than any other employer, and contributing $1.7 billion to the regional economy. Other mainstays of the economy include the Federal Correctional Institution, the diatomaceous earth mine (today owned by Imerys), the Lompoc Oil Field and associated oil processing facilities north of town, and agriculture (especially seed flowers and vegetables). Lompoc is called "The City of Arts and Flowers".

Wine production and wine tourism make up an expanding agricultural sector. Lompoc Valley is the gateway to the Sta. Rita Hills AVA wine appellation, internationally recognized for premium pinot noir and chardonnay. Thirty premium boutique wine labels are produced in Lompoc. Numerous other wineries are located along State Route 246 and on Santa Rosa Road. Tasting rooms are located in various parts of Lompoc.

Since the end of the Cold War, many workers employed in Santa Barbara and Goleta have moved to Lompoc to take advantage of lower housing costs, effectively making Lompoc a bedroom community of Santa Barbara. The character of the town has changed considerably with the growth associated with this demographic shift. In addition, new housing developments are spreading into the adjacent hills on the north side of town.

Cannabis

Upon the legalization of the sale and distribution of cannabis in California, the city had seven recreational marijuana storefronts by February 2020 with nineteen cannabis business licenses having been issued by the city. One of the retail establishment is being licensed for on site consumption claiming to be the first between Los Angeles and San Francisco. A manufacturing facility has been established and a testing lab provides the required analysis for growers. Companies must be licensed by the local agency and the state to grow, test, or sell cannabis and the city may authorize none or only some of these activities. Cannabis dispensaries pay a 6% gross sales tax to the city. Local governments may not prohibit adults, who are in compliance with state laws, from growing, using, or transporting marijuana for personal use.

Government

Public safety
The Lompoc Police Department is the primary law enforcement agency for the city. The city is also served by the Lompoc Fire Department (LFD), which responds to more than 3,800 emergency and non-emergency calls per year.

American Medical Response Santa Barbara County (AMR SBC) provides the primary emergency medical response and ambulance services. The LFD provides mutual aid to the Santa Barbara County Fire Department as well as providing primary fire protection and emergency medical response to the United States Penitentiary, Lompoc.

The Federal Correctional Complex located between Lompoc and Vandenberg SFB includes the medium- and low-security Federal Correctional Institution, Lompoc, two minimum-security camps.

Education

Lompoc is served by the Lompoc Unified School District.

The two high schools in the area are Cabrillo High School and Lompoc High School.

Transportation
State Route 1 is the major north–south artery through Lompoc. State Route 246 heads east to Buellton and the Santa Ynez Valley.

The Surf train station is located to the west at Surf Beach and is served by Amtrak's Pacific Surfliner line. Thruway Motorcoach buses stop in town. Lompoc is also served by City of Lompoc Transit, the Clean Air Express to Santa Barbara/Goleta, and the Breeze Bus to Buellton/Solvang and Santa Maria.

Culture

The Lompoc Valley Flower Festival, held the last week of June, features a parade, carnival, food vendors, and craft show. In 2002, the Bodger Seed Company planted a "floral flag" as a tribute after the September 11 attacks. The "flag" was 740 feet by 390 feet, covered , and was estimated to contain more than 400,000 larkspur plants.

The Lompoc arts scene features a number of artists, musicians, and bands, ranging from singer-songwriters to psychedelic blues-rock bands. At the center of this scene is Certain Sparks Music, a music store and frequent venue for Lompoc's musicians. Certain Sparks opened in 2006 and moved in 2015 from the corner of H & Laurel to South H Street.

Local artists 

One of Lompoc's most successful musical artists is the rock band Saint Anne's Place, which was formed in 2008 and originally featured guitarist and vocalist Jacob Cole, percussionist Samuel Cole, bassist JT Wild and guitarist-vocalist Clive Hacker. Clive Hacker was also a founding member of an earlier locally famous rock band Crash Plastic, who eventually added Jacob Cole to the mix and played famous venues like the 1920's Majestic Ventura Theater. In 2011, Saint Anne's Place members firmly became the Coles and their cousin, Joel, a bassist and keyboard player. They grew up playing in their families' blues bands like The Revelators, Pre-Amp Out and The Hellhounds and released their first EP, Speak Easy, in 2011. The band's music has been described as a "blistering yet rustic mix of blues, psychedelia, and folk rock with the chops of players twice their senior". In 2011, they won the Santa Barbara Independent battle of the bands. They released their second EP, The Earth Shaker, in December 2012 to positive reviews by the local media.

Emily Wryn is a Lompoc songwriter whose music has been featured on NPR’s Morning Becomes Eclectic. Her first EP, Head on Straight, was released in February 2012, and she played at the Indie Week festival in Ireland in April 2014. Wryn also collaborates with a local band, Saint Anne's Place, and in a group called The Lights Electric.

Another band, Millions, led by Randall Sena, played along the Central Coast. Randall Sena was also in a performing band called Le Petite Protest. Sena recorded and produced Wryn's Head on Straight and Saint Anne's Place's Speak Easy in his recording studio, Certain Sparks.

Lompoc Theatre
The Lompoc Theatre, which opened in 1927, was owned and operated by the Calvert family for many years. It encountered financial trouble in the 1970s because of competition from multiplexes and television. The last time a movie was shown on its screen was in 1987.

In July 2003, a non-profit group, the Lompoc Housing and Community Development Corporation, announced plans to restore the theater. With the assistance of the city, the LHCDC was able to raise funds to buy the theater. By March 2008, the cost of renovating the building was estimated at just under $10 million. The LHCDC was unable to raise the money needed for renovations, and the building accumulated three liens. The Lompoc Theatre Project Organization was formed in 2012 with the help of Howlin' Byroon's Music Store (2009-2014) owner Brian W. Cole, Donelle Martin, Carol Benham, Michelle Shaefer and others. It was formally sold, and attaining the keys, to the same grassroots group called the Lompoc Theatre Project in 2016. , restoration and fund-raising is still ongoing.

Lompoc Pops Orchestra 

Founded in 1996, the Lompoc Pops Orchestra consists of about 45 semi-professional musicians under the direction of Dr. Brian Asher Alhadeff. Tts four annual performances include musicals, Broadway hits, jazz pieces, big band, gospel and patriotic music.

Notable people

Julian Araujo, professional soccer player (FC Barcelona Atlètic)
Jeff Bettendorf, professional baseball player (Oakland Athletics)
Mike Bratz, former professional basketball player (San Antonio Spurs, Cleveland Cavaliers, Chicago Bulls, Golden State Warriors, Sacramento Kings, Phoenix Suns)
Casey Candaele, former professional baseball player (Montreal Expos, Houston Astros, and Cleveland Indians)
Ryan Church, former professional baseball player (Washington Nationals, New York Mets, Atlanta Braves, Pittsburgh Pirates, and Arizona Diamondbacks)
Jeffrey Combs, actor, raised in Lompoc
Danny Duffy, professional baseball player (Kansas City Royals)
Jacqueline Gadsden, 1920s film actress, born in Lompoc
Brian Givens, former professional baseball player (Milwaukee Brewers)
Johnnie Gray, former professional football player (Green Bay Packers)
Mark Herrier, actor, graduated from Lompoc High School
Winifred Hervey, executive producer and writer, The Fresh Prince of Bel-Air and The Steve Harvey Show
Roy Howell, former professional baseball player (Texas Rangers, Toronto Blue Jays, and Milwaukee Brewers)
Bill Howerton, former professional baseball player (St. Louis Cardinals, Pittsburgh Pirates, and New York Giants)
Napoleon Kaufman, former professional football player (Oakland Raiders)
Gabe Lopez, singer/songwriter
Jonathan Majors, actor, born in Lompoc 
John D. Nesbitt, western writer and American literature and language educator living in Wyoming
George Perry, Alzheimer's disease researcher and dean and professor of biology at the University of Texas at San Antonio
Duane Solomon, 800m Olympian
Roy Thomas, former professional baseball player (Seattle Mariners)
Tommy Thompson, former professional football player (San Francisco 49ers)
Dorien Wilson, actor, The Parkers and Dream On

Sister cities
Lompoc has five sister cities:
  Cheyenne, Wyoming
  Inca, Spain
  Lake Placid, Florida
  Locarno, Switzerland
  Namwon, Republic of Korea (South Korea)

In popular culture
In 2010, Playboy named Jasper's, a local bar, one of the top 10 dive bars in the country. The bar is the setting of the classic 1940 W.C. Fields comedy The Bank Dick.  Lompoc is also frequently referred to in the TV cartoon series Roger Ramjet, though consistently mispronounced "Lom-pock."

See also

 Federal Correctional Institution, Lompoc
Vandenberg Space Force Base

References

External links

 
 Lompoc Visitors Information Website
 Lompoc Valley Historical Society
 Lompoc Valley Chamber of Commerce & Visitors Bureau
 Lompoc Flower Festival Association

 
1888 establishments in California
Cities in Santa Barbara County, California
Incorporated cities and towns in California
Populated places established in 1888